Chantal Cadieux (born June 15, 1967) is a Canadian writer living in Quebec.

She was born in Richmond and received a diploma in play writing from the National Theatre School of Canada in 1990. She was one of a group of young authors who contributed to the show "38", based on works by Shakespeare, at the Théâtre d'Aujourd'hui.

Her novel Longueur d'ondes received the Prix Communication-Jeunesse. Cadieux also was awarded the  two times: for her play Parfums divers in 1990 and for Urgent besoin d'intimité in 1991. Her scripts for the television series Providence have been nominated several times for the Prix Gémeaux.

Selected works

Theatre 
 Amies à vie
 On court toujours après l'amour
 Urgent besoin d'intimité

Novels 
 Samedi trouble
 Éclipses et jeans
  Longueur d'ondes

Film 
 Le collectionneur, with Ghyslaine Côté, English version The Collector
 Elles étaient cinq, English version The Five of Us

References

External links 
 

1967 births
Living people
Canadian dramatists and playwrights in French
Canadian women screenwriters
Canadian screenwriters in French
Canadian novelists in French
Canadian women novelists